Averil Muriel Williams (19 March 1935 – 16 December 2019) was a British athlete. She competed in the women's javelin throw at the 1960 Summer Olympics.

She also represented England and won a bronze medal in the javelin at the 1958 British Empire and Commonwealth Games in Cardiff, Wales.

References

1935 births
2019 deaths
Athletes (track and field) at the 1960 Summer Olympics
British female javelin throwers
Welsh javelin throwers
Olympic athletes of Great Britain
Sportspeople from Essex
Commonwealth Games medallists in athletics
Commonwealth Games bronze medallists for England
Athletes (track and field) at the 1958 British Empire and Commonwealth Games
Athletes (track and field) at the 1970 British Commonwealth Games
Medallists at the 1958 British Empire and Commonwealth Games